Agadah is a 2017 Italian adventure film based on the novel The Manuscript Found in Saragossa by Jan Potocki.

Cast 
Nahuel Pérez Biscayart - Alfonso di van Worden
Jordi Mollà - Jan Potocki / Diego Hervas
Giulia Bertinelli - Zibbedè
Marta Manduca - Emina 
Caterina Murino - principessa
Marco Foschi - Blas Hervas
Ivan Franek - Thibaud
Valentina Cervi - Ines
Alessandro Haber - Cornandez
Flavio Bucci - vecchio Moreno
Umberto Orsini - Belial
Pilar López de Ayala - Rebecca
Alessio Boni - Pietro di Oria

References

External links 

Italian adventure films
2017 films
2010s Italian-language films
2010s Italian films